Eric J Dubowsky also known as Eric J, is a Grammy, Emmy,  ARIA, and APRA award-winning mixer, songwriter and record producer. Eric grew up in the New York City suburb of Tenafly, New Jersey and graduated from Tenafly High School in 1993.  After attending Syracuse University he worked at Greene St. Recording in New York City, the home of early hip-hop artists Run-DMC, and Public Enemy. It was here Eric assisted engineer/producer, Rod Hui. That led to a job working with Atlantic Records producer Arif Mardin in 1998.

Eric has worked with artists such as Flume, Weezer, ODESZA, Twenty One Pilots, Kylie Minogue, Dua Lipa, Chet Faker, Brandy, Jeff Bhasker, Andy Grammer, Tove Lo, St. Vincent, The Chemical Brothers, Alessia Cara, Demi Lovato, Angus & Julia Stone, Freeform Five, Ruel, Kimbra, Mansionair, Panama, Hayden James, Meg Mac, Yuka Honda, Flight Facilities, Joss Stone, The Rubens, Marc Kinchen, Lisa Mitchell, Carolina Liar, and actress Emmy Rossum.

Eric received the 2014 ARIA award for Best Engineer for his work mixing the Chet Faker album, Built on Glass. He received the 2016 ARIA award for Best Engineer, alongside Flume, for his work on Skin. He also won a Grammy Award. In 2021 Eric won an APRA award for Most Played Electronic work for the song "Rushing Back" which he co-wrote with Flume and Vera Blue.

He was the lead singer of the New York City-based band Essex, which he formed with Jeff Buckley drummer, Matt Johnson. He sang and played guitar and keyboards in The Relationship with Weezer guitarist Brian Bell. He also produced and recorded their self-titled album. Eric worked as an engineer for the Los Angeles-based rock band Weezer on The Red Album produced by Rick Rubin. He composed the theme song to VH-1's Metal Mania and the theme for World Extreme Cagefighting on Versus and later the UFC.

Awards and nominations

ARIA Music Awards
The ARIA Music Awards is an annual awards ceremony that recognises excellence, innovation, and achievement across all genres of Australian music. 

|-
| 2014
| Built on Glass by Chet Faker
| ARIA Award for Engineer of the Year
| 
|-
| 2016
| Skin by Flume
| ARIA Award for Engineer of the Year
| 
|-
| 2020
| Free Time by Ruel
| ARIA Award for Engineer of the Year
| 
|-
| 2021
| 0202 by The Rubens
| ARIA Award for Engineer of the Year
| 
|-
| rowspan="2"| 2022
| Dann Hume & Eric J Dubowsky for Conversations by Budjerah 
| rowspan="2"|  Mix Engineer – Best Mixed Album
| 
|-
| Eric J Dubowsky for Palaces by Flume
| 
|-

References

External links
 SoundCloud

Living people
Record producers from New Jersey
People from Tenafly, New Jersey
Syracuse University alumni
Tenafly High School alumni
Year of birth missing (living people)